Carmine Pierre-Dufour is a Canadian film director and screenwriter from Quebec. She is most noted as co-director with Émilie Mannering of the short film Mahalia Melts in the Rain, which was a shortlisted Canadian Screen Award nominee for Best Live Action Short Drama at the 7th Canadian Screen Awards in 2019.

Her 2021 film Fanmi, codirected with Sandrine Brodeur-Desrosiers, was named to the Toronto International Film Festival's annual year-end Canada's Top Ten list for 2021.

She has also been a writer and story editor for the television series Big Top Academy and Transplant.

References

External links

21st-century Canadian screenwriters
21st-century Canadian women writers
Canadian women film directors
Canadian women screenwriters
Canadian television writers
Black Canadian writers
Black Canadian women
Black Canadian filmmakers
Film directors from Quebec
Writers from Quebec
Living people
Year of birth missing (living people)
Canadian women television writers